Odisha Football Club Reserves and Academy is the reserves side and the youth setup of Indian Super League side Odisha, that competes in the Elite League, the elite youth football league of Indian football.

History
On 20 February 2018, it was announced by the All India Football Federation, the organising body for Indian football, that Delhi Dynamos Football Club, along with six other Indian Super League sides, would field a reserve team in the I-League 2nd Division, India's second division football league. The reserve side squad and coaches were then unveiled a few weeks later. On 6 March 2018, Francisco Perez Lazaro was confirmed as the reserve side's first head coach. The 2017–18 I-League 2nd Division was their first and last season in the league. Since then, the team has been participating in the Elite League, India's elite youth league. The team participated as Delhi Dynamos FC Reserves for the 2018–19 season.

Odisha
Ahead of the 2019–20 Indian football season, the club decided to relocated to its new base, i.e. the Kalinga Stadium in Bhubaneswar, Odisha and rechristen itself as Odisha FC. In the presence of the Naveen Patnaik, the Chief Minister of Odisha, and Tusharkanti Behera, the Minister for Department of Sports and Youth Services (DSYS), Government of Odisha, the Delhi Soccer Private Limited signed a Memorandum of Understanding (MoU) with the Government of Odisha, to facilitate the move, i.e. from the national capital New Delhi to Bhubaneswar. As per the MoU, it was mutually decided that the club's first team, youth teams, youth football development program and grassroots football development program will be based in Odisha.

Squads

Reserves

U18

Youth Player of the Season

U18

U15

U13

Records and statistics

Overview

Reserves

Youth

Head coaches' record

Reserves

Youth

Personnel

See also
 Odisha FC
 Odisha FC Women

References

External links

 

Odisha FC
Indian reserve football teams
Football academies in India
Association football clubs established in 2018
Youth League U18
2019 establishments in Odisha